Pakistan Institute of Legislative Development and Transparency, or commonly called Pildat, is a Pakistani think tank which promotes democracy. Pildat is an independent, non-profit oriented think tank that mainly focuses on democracy, governance and public policy.

They also organize Youth Parliament of Pakistan.

References

2001 establishments in Pakistan
Think tanks based in Pakistan
Think tanks established in 2001